Pactomania was a period of treaty making by the United States during the early Cold War. During the Presidency of Dwight D. Eisenhower, the United States, mainly through the efforts of Secretary of State John Foster Dulles, formed alliances with 42 separate nations along with treaty relations with nearly 100, which observers described as "pactomania." These pacts sometimes permitted military interventions pursuant to the provisions for collective self-defense in Article 51 of Chapter VII of the United Nations Charter.

See also
ANZUS
METO
NATO
NEATO
SEATO
 Rio Treaty

References

Cold War treaties